Mary Esther Bedford (27 March 1907 – 8 September 1997 in Durban) was a South African freestyle swimmer who competed in the 1928 Summer Olympics.

In 1928 she was a member of the South African relay team which won the bronze medal in the 4 × 100 m freestyle relay event. She also competed in the 400 metre freestyle competition, but was eliminated in the first round.

External links
Mary Bedford's profile at Sports Reference.com

1907 births
1997 deaths
South African female swimmers
South African female freestyle swimmers
Olympic swimmers of South Africa
Swimmers at the 1928 Summer Olympics
Olympic bronze medalists for South Africa
Olympic bronze medalists in swimming
South African people of British descent
Medalists at the 1928 Summer Olympics
20th-century South African women